Max von der Grün (25 May 1926 – 7 April 2005) was a German novelist.

Max von der Grün was born in Sankt Georgen (Bayreuth) and grew up in Mitterteich. After a clerical apprenticeship, he became a paratrooper during World War II in 1944. He was captured by U.S. forces near Quimper (France) and became a prisoner of war, spending three years in prison camps in Scotland, Louisiana, Texas, and New Mexico.

After his release, he worked as a bricklayer, and from 1951 to 1963 in the Zeche Königsborn mine near Unna. He started writing in 1955, initially poetry, later focusing on worker-class themes.

He was a founding member of the Dortmunder Gruppe 61, and a member of the International PEN.

Von der Grün died in Dortmund.

Works 

 Geheimes Kochbuch, Darmstadt 1960
 Männer in zweifacher Nacht, Recklinghausen 1962
 Irrlicht und Feuer, Recklinghausen 1963
 Fahrtunterbrechung und andere Erzählungen, Frankfurt a. M. 1965
 Feierabend, Recklinghausen 1968 (together with Hans Dieter Schwarze)
 Zwei Briefe an Pospischiel, Neuwied u. a. 1968
 Flug über Zechen und Wälder. Nordrhein-Westfalen. Land der Gegensätze, Braunschweig 1970
 Urlaub am Plattensee, Stierstadt i. Ts. 1970
 Am Tresen gehn die Lichter aus, Stierstadt (im Taunus) 1972
 Stenogramm, Düsseldorf 1972
 Ein Tag wie jeder andere. Düsseldorf [1973], 2. Aufl. 1976; u.d.T.: Ein Tag wie jeder andere. Reisen in die Gegenwart. Nach Südiler und zurück. München 1978
 Menschen in Deutschland (BRD). 7 Porträts, Darmstadt u. a. 1973
 Stellenweise Glatteis, Darmstadt u. a. 1973
 Leben im gelobten Land. Gastarbeiterporträts, Darmstadt u. a. 1975
 Wenn der tote Rabe vom Baum fällt, München 1975
 , München 1976
 Flächenbrand, Darmstadt u. a. 1979
 Unsere Fabrik (Fotoband), Luzern [u.a.] 1979 (together with Oren Schmuckler and Günter Wallraff)
 Wie war das eigentlich? Kindheit und Jugend im Dritten Reich Darmstadt u. a. 1979, als Taschenbuch: dtv 
 Etwas außerhalb der Legalität und andere Erzählungen, Darmstadt u. a. 1980
 Unterwegs in Deutschland, Reinbek bei Hamburg 1980
 Klassengespräche, Darmstadt u. a. 1981
 Maloche. Leben im Revier [Fotobuch mit der Gruppe Anthrazit], Frankfurt am Main 1982
 Späte Liebe, Darmstadt u. a. 1982
 Friedrich und Friederike, Darmstadt u. a. 1983
 Unser schönes Nordrhein-Westfalen. Von Menschen und Natur, von Kohle und Kultur, Frankfurt am Main 1983
 Die Lawine, Darmstadt u. a. 1986
 Waldläufer und Brückensteher, Stuttgart 1987
 Das Revier. Eine Liebeserklärung, Dortmund 1988 (together with Peter Iwers)
 Eine Jugend in Franken, Göttingen 1990
 Springflut, Frankfurt am Main 1990
 Die Saujagd und andere Vorstadtgeschichten, München 1995
 Die schöne Unbekannte, Reinbek bei Hamburg 1997
 Vorstadtkrokodile. Eine Geschichte vom Aufpassen; ein Leseprojekt zu dem gleichnamigen Roman von Max von der Grün. Berlin 2000 (together with S. Schlepp-Pellny)

Filmography
Irrlicht und Feuer, directed by Heinz Thiel and Horst E. Brandt (TV film, East Germany, 1966, based on the novel of the same name)
Zwei Briefe an Pospischiel, directed by Ralf Kirsten (TV film, East Germany, 1970, based on the novel of the same name)
Stellenweise Glatteis, directed by Wolfgang Petersen (TV film, West Germany, 1975, based on the novel of the same name)
, directed by Wolfgang Becker (TV film, West Germany, 1977, based on the novel )
, directed by Christian Ditter (Germany, 2009, based on the novel )
, directed by Christian Ditter (Germany, 2010)
, directed by Christian Ditter (Germany, 2011)

Screenwriter
Am Tresen, directed by Johann-Richard Hänsel (TV series, 14 episodes, West Germany, 1967–1968)
Aufstiegschancen, directed by Thomas Fantl (TV film, West Germany, 1971)

External links 
 Literary encyclopedia

1926 births
2005 deaths
People from Bayreuth
Writers from Bavaria
German male novelists
20th-century German novelists
20th-century German male writers